Bridget Jones's Diary: Music from the Motion Picture is the official soundtrack to the 2001 British romantic comedy film, directed by Sharon Maguire.

The film's soundtrack was composed by Patrick Doyle. It also features two hit songs that were released as singles, "Out of Reach" by Gabrielle and "It's Raining Men" by Geri Halliwell. The single became Halliwell's fourth consecutive number-one hit single on the UK Singles Chart and it became her most successful solo single to date. "Feels Like Sex", another song from the album was originally slated as the lead single, but after "It's Raining Men" was offered to Halliwell, the song was released as the first single, and was added to Scream If You Wanna Go Faster.

Halliwell's version received positive reviews by music critics, experienced international success and hit the top ten in over two dozen countries around the world, going to number one in several of them, although it did not fare as well on the American charts. However, in the United Kingdom, "It's Raining Men" debuted at number-one on the UK Singles Chart and stayed there for two weeks. It became Halliwell's fourth consecutive number-one single in the UK, selling 155,000 units in its first week and 80,000 in its second week. Overall the single went on to sell 440,000 copies in Britain alone, becoming the 13th best seller of 2001 and Halliwell's most successful single worldwide.

The song was a big success in France being certified "Diamond" by the Syndicat National de l'Édition Phonographique (SNEP). With this song, Geri Halliwell won the International Song of the Year award at the 2002 NRJ Music Awards in France. A remix of the song, The Almighty Mix from the Toshiba-EMI series "Dance Mania", volume 20 was also featured in the 2002 Japanese video games, DDRMAX2 Dance Dance Revolution 7thMix and Dance Dance Revolution EXTREME. This version of the song was used as the theme song in the advertisements for New Talent Singing Awards Vancouver Audition 2003. In July 2006 the song entered at seventy-nine on the Mexican Digital Sales Chart, spending two weeks inside the Top 100.

Halliwell was inspired by the 1980 film Fame for the video. She said, "I was just watching Fame on video and I thought what a great excuse". During the video she also does ballet.

Track listing

Charts

Weekly charts

Year-end charts

Certifications

References

2001 soundtrack albums
2000s film soundtrack albums
Bridget Jones
Comedy film soundtracks
Romance film soundtracks